History of Shi'ism in Kashmir is marked with conflict and strife, spanning over half a millennium. Incidents of sectarian violence occurred in Kashmir under the rule of Mirza Haider Dughlat, followed by the Mughals (1586–1752), the Afghans (1752–1819), the Sikhs (1819–1845) and the Dogras (1846–1947). A small Shia community has managed to survive in Kashmir till today.

Background 

In 1381 CE, after Timur invaded Iran, Mir Syed Ali Hamdani, an Iranian Sufi arrived in Kashmir with a large number of disciples and preached Islam. He instilled the love of Ahlul Bayt in the hearts of the new converts and wrote many books and tracts. Shi'ism was properly introduced by Mir Shams-ud Din Iraqi whose spiritual inspiration Syed Muhammad Noor Bakhsh belonged to the Sufi order of Mir Syed Ali Hamdani and had huge following base in Iran, Qandhar, Kabul and Kashmir. Mir Shams-ud Din arrived in Kashmir in 1481 CE and then returned to Iran. Twenty years later in 1501 CE, he came to Kashmir again, along with 700 Shia Sufis, scholars and missionaries.  In 1505 CE, the King of the Shah Mir Dynasty converted to Shi'ism and so did the Chak clan of Kashmir. Mir Shams-ud Din Iraqi traveled in the valleys of Himalayas and spread Shi'ism from Skardu to Tibet, converting thousands of Hindus and Buddhists to Shi'ism. In 1586 CE, Kashmir was merged with the Mughal Empire. Mughals appointed talented officers and contributed greatly to the cultural and economic life of Kashmir. In 1753 CE Kashmir was conquered by Ahmad Shah Abdali, whose descendants ruled over Kashmir until they lost it to Sikhs in 1819 CE. The Kashmir valley came under the Dogra rule with the treaty of Amritsar signed between the British and Maharajah Gulab Singh of Jammu in 1846.

According to the 1873 British gazetteer of Kashmir:

The Incidents

The first cycle 
In 1532 CE, Sultan Said Khan dispatched an army under the command of Mirza Haider Dughlat that attacked Baltistan and Ladakh from Kashgar. He suffered a military defeat and after death of Said Khan, joined the Mughal King Humayun in Agra. He returned to Kashmir 1540 CE, accompanied by 400 Mughal troops, at the invitation of one of the two rival factions that continually fought for power in Kashmir. He put an end to the Chak rule. His reign was a reign of terror and Shias had no choice but to practice Taqiyya. He asked opinion of Sunni scholars on a book, fiqh-i-Ahwat by Syed Muhammad Noorbakhsh, which was declared heresy. Mirza Dughlat writes:

Mirza's policy of religious discrimination accelerated his decline. This sparked an all-out uprising and Dughlat was assassinated by the end of the same year and the Chak rule was restored.

The second cycle
In 1554, a Shia soldier Yusuf Mandav had a fight with a Sunni cleric Qazi Habibullah Khawarizmi after religious arguments. Qazi received serious injuries. However, the Qazi survived and Yusuf had hastily been stoned to death by a Sunni judge for attempting to kill him. The Shias demanded that justice be observed and the man who issued the decree for Yusuf's stoning-to-death be punished. Mirza Muqim, Akbar's envoy, killed Qazi Musa and Mulla Yusuf, resulting in tensions between the two communities.

One violent sectarian clash came in 1568, which resulted in tensions between Kashmir's ruler and Akbar. In 1585 CE, the ruler Yaqub Shah Chak demanded that Sunnis raise Shia slogans, which created divide. This provided Mughal Empire a perfect opportunity to attack Kashmir. Mirza Qasim Khan annexed Kashmir into Mughal Empire. The Chak rule came to an end and finally in 1589, the Mughal king Akbar extended his rule to Kashmir.

The third cycle 
By the end of sixteenth century, famous Sunni saint Ahmad Sirhindi (1564 - 1624) had penned down a treatise under the title "Radd-e-Rawafiz" to justify the slaughter of Shias by Abdullah Khan Uzbek in Mashhad. In this he argues:

Itqad Khan, who held the post of governor for eleven years, was a ruthless tyrant. He treated the Shias with utmost brutality. The Naqshbandi saints Khawaja Khawand Mahmud and disciples of Ahmad Sirhindi disliked Shias. During Zafar Khan's first rule, in 1636 CE, while people were picking fruits, an argument started between a Shia and a Sunni and it escalated to an all-out attack on the Shia neighborhoods.

The fourth cycle 

In 1684 CE, the fourth Taraaj started with a financial matter between a Shia businessman Abdul Shakoor and a Sunni named Sadiq. Abdul Shakoor was alleged to have insulted the Companions of the Prophet and a local cleric issued a fatwa against him. Sunni mob attacked the Shia neighborhood of Hasan Abad for collective punishment. The governor Ibrahim Khan offered him security and tried to control the situation, but the Sunni clerics managed to bring in militias of Sunni Pashtun tribesmen from Kabul. They forced the governor to hand over the Shia businessman, his two sons and a son-in-law to the mob for lynching. A Sunni cleric, Mulla Muhammad Tahir Mufti tried to stop the mob, but his house was set on fire too. Another Shia notable, Baba Qasim, was caught by the invading militias, humiliated and tortured to death. Governor Ibrahim Khan's mansion was too set on fire. The state tried to control the riots and some of the perpetrators were punished by death. Emperor Aurangzeb removed Ibrahim Khan from governorship and released the Sunni perpetrators. This incident is described as the worst intra-Muslim sectarian clash during Aurangzeb's rule.

The fifth cycle 
In 1719 CE, Emperor Muhammad Shah claimed the throne of Delhi. A cleric Mulla Abd-un-Nabi, also known as Mahtavi Khan, had been awarded a special status of Shaikh-ul-Islam by the Emperor. Muhammad Shah changed his policy and deprived the Mulla of special lordship and took back his jagir. He decided to create disorder by organizing a campaign of hate against Hindus and Shias. This affair led to riots, the fanatics among the Sunnis started to attack properties of Hindus and Shias, and police used force to protect them. Meanwhile Mulla Abd-un-Nabi got killed and rumors spread that a Shia official had conspired his assassination. The supporters of Mulla, led by his son Sharaf-ud-Din, attacked the Shia neighborhood of Zadibal. The lawlessness prevailed for two years until a large Mughal force entered Kashmir from Lahore in 1722 under Abdul Samad Khan and the rebel leader Sharaf-ud-Din was killed. Norman Hollister writes:

This taraaj coincided with a power struggle among Delhi elites. Imad-ul-Mulk got some Sunni theologians on his side to declare a holy war against Safdar Jang, a Shia by faith. The propaganda called upon Sunnis to take up arms to defend the first three Caliphs. This hate mongering resulted in several bloody massacres of Shias in Kashmir and Punjab.

The sixth cycle 
In 1741 - 1745 CE, there was a rebellion against the Mughal governor Inayat Ullah. Following Nadir Shah's invasion of Delhi, the deputy Abu Barkat Khan rebelled against his master and declared himself independent king, murdering Inayat Ullah in 1741. Mughal Emperor appointed Asad Yar Khan as governor of Kashmir. This resulted in a revolt led by Dir Ullah Beg, together with some Shia soldiers. As a revenge, Abu Barkat Khan inflicted atrocities towards the Shia civilians of Srinagar.

The seventh cycle 
In 1762 - 1764 CE, the Afghan ruler of Kashmir Buland Khan Bamzai persecuted the Shias. Under the subedari of Amir Khan Jawan Sher, who supported Shias, once the rumor spread that some Shias have passed negative remarks about a Sufi saint Habibullah Nowsheri. Furious Sunni mob attacked Zadibal neighborhood and torched the houses belonging to the Shias. Buland Khan ordered arrests of the Shias accused of blasphemy. In 1765, a Shia cleric Hafiz Abdullah was punished by beheading for preaching Shia faith. In 1788, when the then governor Juma Khan Alokzai went to Kabul to help prince Timur, sectarian riot broke out.

The eighth cycle 
In 1803 CE, violent clashes broke out between Shias and Sunnis. The British gazetteer notes:

The ninth cycle 
Kashmir was conquered by Sikhs in 1819. This was the time when Syed Ahmad Barelvi, who later became famous for his war against Sikh Empire, was visiting towns of North Indian planes with hundreds of missionaries to preach against Shia beliefs and practices. Syed Ahmad repeatedly destroyed tazias, an act that resulted in subsequent riots and chaos. Since the reign of Emperor Aurangzeb, the Shias were supposed to provide the new carpets every year for Jamia Masjid, Srinagar. A violent clash occurred during the governorship of Bhima Singh Ardali. In 1831 CE, the Shia suburb of Zadibal was set on fire. The British gazetteer notes:

In May 1831, Syed Ahmad Barelvi was killed in Balakot while trying to enter Kashmir.

The tenth cycle 
In 1872 CE, brutal attacks were orchestrated against Shias during the reign of Dogra Raja Ranbir Singh. The bitter violence centered around a dispute over a shrine but on the background the economic conflict between Shias and Sunnis can not be ignored. The shawl market was dominated by the high quality fabrics produced by Shia weavers of Zadibal. The British gazetteer narrates the riots as follows:

Modern Times
Major mourning processions have been banned by the Government of Jammu and Kashmir since the 1990s when there was a rise in insurgency in the state. Smaller processions are permitted in some vast Shia areas of the state, including in the districts of Bandipora, Srinagar, Budgam, Parts of Ganderbal, Baramulla, Leh and Kargil. 

In the post 9/11 scenario, sectarian terrorism has resurfaced in Kashmir. Here are some of the recent incidents of brutality:-
 November 3, 2000: Assassination of Shia religious leader Agha Syed Mehdi in Budgam.
 A prominent Kashmiri Shia religious leader from srinagar, Iftikhar Ansari was thrice the target of unsuccessful assassination attempts. In June 2000, Ansari barely escaped the explosion of a landmine while addressing a religious congregation at Gund Khwaja Qasim Pattan. The blast killed twelve of his followers. On 1 September 2000, Ansari was injured by an IED explosion that killed two polic including his driver.
 December 27, 2009: Suicide bombing on Shia gathering in Muzaffarabad in Pakistan administered Kashmir leaves 10 dead, 65 injured.
February 15, 2017: Assassination attempt on Shia cleric and his wife in Muzaffarabad in Pakistan administered Kashmir.

See also

 Outline of Genocide studies
 Bibliography of Genocide studies
Shia Islam
Shia Islam in the Indian subcontinent
Tomb of Shams-ud-Din Araqi
Kashmir
Anti-Shi'ism
Persecution of Hazaras
Persecution of Shias by the Islamic State
 Tafazzul Husain Kashmiri

References 

Bibliography
 
 
 
 
―  
―

External links
 Taraaj-e Shia

Anti-Shi'ism
Shia Islam in India
Shia Islam in Pakistan
Sectarian violence
Shia–Sunni sectarian violence
Shia Muslims
Violence against Shia Muslims
Persecution of Muslims
Islam-related controversies
Shia Islam
Human rights abuses in India
Human rights abuses in Pakistan
Genocides in Asia